She Demons is a 1958 American independent black-and-white science fiction horror film, produced by Arthur A. Jacobs and Marc Frederic, directed and co-written by Richard E. Cunha, that stars Irish McCalla, Tod Griffin, and Victor Sen Yung. Made in the tongue-in-cheek style of Men's adventure magazines, Nazisploitation, and The Island of Lost Souls, the film was distributed by Astor Pictures in March, 1958 as a double feature with Cunha's Giant from the Unknown.

Plot
During a tropical storm, a pleasure boat is shipwrecked on an uncharted island and is presumed lost with all hands after the storm clears. The four survivors' shipboard radio can only receive but not transmit, and they hear that their castaway island will soon be used by U.S. Navy aircraft as a bombing target.

Finding strange-looking human footprints and hearing the sound of jungle drums, three of the party explore the island. They soon discover the island is populated by deformed, fanged women who are the product of scientific experiments of Nazis led by a mad scientist and war criminal, who rules the island with an iron swastika.

The survivors eventually manage to blow up the island before the Navy jets can do so.

Cast
Irish McCalla as Jerrie Turner
Tod Griffin as Fred Maklin
Victor Sen Yung as Sammy Ching
Rudolph Anders as Col. Karl Osler
Gene Roth as Igor
Leni Tana as Mona Osler
Charles Opunui as Kris Kamana
 The Diane Nellis Dancers  as The She Demons

Analysis
Victor Sen Yung's character is atypical compared to other Asian characters the era, speaking ordinary American English and being a college graduate and Phi Beta Kappa member.

Production
After completing Giant from the Unknown, Astor Pictures told Richard Cunha that the film would only be accepted if he made another co-feature, to be released by Astor on a double bill. This led Cunha to make She Demons. Astor advanced $80,000, with Cunha completing the film for $65,000. Filming locations for She Demons were at Ferndale, California, Griffith Park, and Paradise Cove Pier in Malibu, California. David Koehler handled the special effects. H.E. Barrie, who co-wrote the screenplay, also wrote the scripts for two of Cunha's other 1950s films, Missile to the Moon and Frankenstein's Daughter.

Reception
Writing in DVD Talk, film critic Glenn Erickson described the film as a "totally bizarre oddity" and "[o]ne of the sleaziest kiddie matinee movies of the '50s," but also "a great party picture with everything camp enthusiasts enjoy - terrible jokes, hammy acting, terrible direction." Critic Joe Lozowsky wrote that the film is a "so-bad-it's good cult favorite," and that "[o]nce head moron Gene Roth shows up with his bad accent, you can't help but expect Moe, Larry, and Joe Besser to blunder onto the cardboard set and trade eye pokes."

Notes

External links

Joe Dante on She Demons at Trailers from Hell
 Original soundtrack for She Demons

1958 films
1958 directorial debut films
1950s English-language films
1950s independent films
1950s science fiction horror films
American black-and-white films
American independent films
American science fiction horror films
Astor Pictures films
Films directed by Richard E. Cunha
Films set on islands
Mad scientist films
Nazi exploitation films
Nazi zombie films
1950s American films